The Long Beach Public Library (LBPL) is an American public library system located in Long Beach, California.

Main Library

The Main Library's first building was funded by a $30,000 donation from Andrew Carnegie and $4,000 of city funds. The Library opened in 1909 within Pacific Park, now known as Lincoln Park, downtown on Pacific Avenue at Broadway.  When the building site was condemned for construction of a New Main Library and City Hall building in the late 1970s, the library was moved to a building located on Ximeno Avenue, for a period of about 18 months.

In 2015, the Long Beach Public Library became the first library in California to begin circulating zines publicly in its collection. Now the main branch houses a few hundred zines to take home.

In January 2019, the Main Library was permanently closed in lieu of the new location, which reopened on September 21, 2019, as the Billie Jean King Main Library, with King attending the ribbon-cutting ceremony herself. The building occupies a first floor and lower level at 101 Pacific Avenue, at the intersection of Ocean Boulevard and Pacific Avenue, across the park from its former location.

The library displays nine murals titled "9 Children's Stories" by artist Suzanne Miller, created with the support of the Federal Art Project and Works Progress Administration.

Branches

The Long Beach Public Library operates the following branches:
Alamitos
Ruth Bach
Bay Shore
Brewitt
Burnett
Dana
El Dorado
Bret Harte
Los Altos
Mark Twain
Michelle Obama

The Alamitos branch was constructed by the Works Progress Administration in 1938.

Databases and downloadable media
Databases are available to Long Beach Public Library cardholders.
Overdrive Audio Books for Download are available free to LBPL card holders for work, school, or on the road.
Kanopy streaming is available free to LBPL card holders
Click here to find out about getting a library card.

References

External links
 
 Long Beach Public Library on Facebook

Libraries in Los Angeles County, California
Organizations based in Long Beach, California
 Library
Federal depository libraries
Public libraries in California